The 2011 Women's National Invitation Tournament (WNIT) was an annual single-elimination tournament of 64 National Collegiate Athletic Association (NCAA) Division I teams that were not selected to participate in the 2011 NCAA Division I women's basketball tournament. The tournament was played entirely on campus sites. The highest ranked team in each conference that did not receive a bid to the NCAA Tournament received an automatic bid to this tournament. The remaining slots were filled by the WNIT Selection Committee. In the championship game, the Toledo Rockets defeated the USC Trojans, 76–68, before a sellout crowd of 7,301 at Savage Arena in Toledo, Ohio. The tournament MVP, Naama Shafir, scored a career-high 40 points to lead the Rockets.

2010 Preseason WNIT
At the beginning of the season, there is a Preseason WNIT.

Round 1
The games for round one were played on November 12.

Bracket 1
Purdue* 93, Austin Peay 53
Toledo* 71, St. Francis (PA) 66
South Dakota State* 87, Utah Valley 38
Hampton 69, James Madison* 64

Bracket 2
DePaul* 84, Valparaiso 53
Missouri State* 83, Lamar 60
Charlotte* 72, Iona 40
Florida* 77, Central Florida 67

Round 2
The games for round two were played on November 15.

Bracket 1
Purdue* 79, Toledo 66
South Dakota State* 76, Hampton 64

Bracket 2
DePaul 82, Missouri State* 66
Florida* 76, Charlotte 70

Semifinals and Finals

Note: Asterisk denotes home team

Consolation Bracket

Round 1
The games for Consolation round one were played on Friday, November 19.
Central Florida 59, Iona 48
James Madison 64, St. Francis (PA) 49
Valparaiso 72, Austin Peay 57
Lamar 83, Utah Valley 66

Round 2
The games for Consolation round two were played on Saturday, November 20.
James Madison 82, Central Florida 78 (OT)
Lamar 74, Valparaiso 58
St. Francis (PA) 77, Iona 64
Austin Peay 73, Utah Valley 69

Round 3
The games for Consolation round three were played on November 19 or 20.
Charlotte 64, Hampton 57
Missouri State 73, Toledo 69

2011 Postseason WNIT
The 2011 Women's National Invitation Tournament (WNIT) is a single-elimination tournament of 64 National Collegiate Athletic Association (NCAA) Division I teams that did not participate in the 2010 NCAA Division I women's basketball tournament. The 43rd annual tournament was played from March 16, 2011 to April 2, 2011, entirely on campus sites. The highest ranked team in each conference that did not receive a bid to the NCAA Tournament received an automatic bid to this tournament. The remaining slots were filled by the WNIT Selection Committee.

Participants

Automatic bids

At-large bids

Brackets
Results to date (* by score indicates game went to overtime; H indicates host school):

Region 1

Region 2

Region 3

Region 4

Semifinals and championship game
Played at host schools

All-tournament team
 Naama Shafir, Toledo (MVP)
 Yolanda Richardson, Toledo
 Ashley Corral, USC
 Briana Gilbreath, USC
 Shannon McCallum, Charlotte
 Emily Hanley, Illinois State
Source:

See also
 2011 NCAA Division I men's basketball tournament
 2011 NCAA Division I women's basketball tournament
 2011 National Invitation Tournament
 2011 Women's Basketball Invitational

References

Women's National Invitation Tournament
Women's National Invitation Tournament
Women's National Invitation Tournament
Women's National Invitation Tournament
Women's National Invitation Tournament